Clarence Josef McLin Sr. (August 20, 1899 – December 20, 1966) was an American civic leader and businessman in Dayton, Ohio.

Early life 
McLin was born in Tennessee and also lived in Chicago.

Career 
McLin founded the McLin Funeral Home in 1932. He served as the eighth president of the Dayton Branch of the NAACP from 1937 to 1938. McLin ran for the Ohio House of Representatives in 1966. He later co-founded, with State Representative Larry G. Smith, the Black Elected Democrats of Ohio (later the Ohio Legislative Black Caucus). McLin also founded the Democratic Voters League and ran unsuccessfully for the Dayton City Commission.

Personal life 
He and his wife Rubie (1904–1997) were married on April 28, 1920. They moved to Dayton, Ohio around 1931. McLin's son, C. J. McLin, served as a Democratic member of the Ohio House of Representatives.

His granddaughter, Rhine McLin, served as a minority leader of the Ohio Senate and was the mayor of Dayton from 2002 to 2010.

References

External links

1899 births
1966 deaths
Burials at Woodland Cemetery and Arboretum
American civil rights activists
People from Dayton, Ohio
Activists from Ohio